Terry Miller may refer to:

Terry Miller (running back) (born 1956), retired American football running back
Terry Miller (linebacker) (born 1947), retired American football linebacker
Terry Miller (politician) (1942–1989), American politician, Lieutenant Governor of Alaska, 1978–1982
Terry Miller (engineer) (1909–1989), British railway engineer
Terry Miller (water polo) (born 1932), British Olympic water polo player